The 2008 Asian Youth Girls Volleyball Championship was held in PhilSports Arena, Manila, Philippines from 11 to 18 October 2008.

Pools composition
The teams are seeded based on their final ranking at the 2007 Asian Youth Girls Volleyball Championship.

Preliminary round

Pool A

|}

|}

Pool B

|}

|}

Pool C

|}

|}

Pool D

|}

|}

Classification round
 The results and the points of the matches between the same teams that were already played during the preliminary round shall be taken into account for the classification round.

Pool E

|}

|}

Pool F

|}

|}

Pool G

|}

|}

Pool H

|}

|}

Classification 9th–12th

Semifinals

|}

11th place

|}

9th place

|}

Final round

Quarterfinals

|}

5th–8th semifinals

|}

Semifinals

|}

7th place

|}

5th place

|}

3rd place

|}

Final

|}

Final standing

Awards
MVP:  Shiori Murata
Best Scorer:  Yang Jie
Best Spiker:  Shiori Murata
Best Blocker:  Wang Huimin
Best Server:  Kim Mi-yeon
Best Setter:  Chisato Mitsuyama
Best Libero:  Sumiko Mori

References
 www.asianvolleyball.org

External links
FIVB

A
V
V
Asian women's volleyball championships